The Socialist Youth Union (UJS), founded 1984, is the youth organization of the Communist Party of Brazil.

External links

Communist Party of Brazil
Youth wings of political parties in Brazil
Youth wings of communist parties
Youth organizations established in 1984